Brasted is a disused intermediate railway station in Brasted, Kent on the closed Westerham Valley branch line. The station closed in 1961 and the site is covered by the carriageway of the M25 motorway that was constructed along the route of the disused railway.

The station was built by the Westerham Valley Railway (WVR) opened on 3 July 1881. The WVR was taken over by the South Eastern Railway in August 1881 which became the South Eastern and Chatham Railway in 1899. Operations passed to the Southern Railway upon the railway grouping in 1923 and thereafter on nationalisation of the railways to the Southern Region of British Railways which closed the Westerham Branch on 30 October 1961 due to low patronage.

The line was the subject of a revival/preservation attempt which was unsuccessful as the Association could not raise the required funds to rebuild a bridge at Chevening which had been demolished to widen the A21 Seven Oaks Bypass. The track was lifted by 1967 and the station demolished in 1977 during construction of the M25.

The station approach to Brasted is now a works road leading on to the M25, with the actual accessway covering the site of the former booking hall. Just beyond that area is the former station goods yard, formerly occupied by a local coal merchant, which appears derelict and is closed off by steel gates. The stationmaster's house has survived and lies to the south.

Other stations 
 Westerham
 Chevening Halt
 Dunton Green

References 

Disused railway stations in Kent
Former South Eastern Railway (UK) stations
Railway stations in Great Britain opened in 1881
Railway stations in Great Britain closed in 1961
1881 establishments in England